Jonas Prapiestis (born 2 August 1952) is a Lithuanian judge, Professor of criminal law and politician, born in Kupiškis. In 1990 he was among those who signed the Act of the Re-Establishment of the State of Lithuania.

Biography 

Jonas Prapiestis has graduated the Law Faculty of Vilnius University in 1975 and has worked as a lecturer in the Department of the Criminal Law of the Faculty.

He worked as a judge in the field of Criminal law and Criminal procedure at Lietuvos Aukščiausiasis Teismas.

References

1952 births
Living people
People from Kupiškis
Ministers of Justice of Lithuania
Lithuanian legal scholars
Scholars of criminal law
Judges of the Constitutional Court of Lithuania
Moscow State University alumni